Jake 2.0 is an American science fiction television series created by Silvio Horta that premiered on UPN on September 10, 2003. The series was canceled on January 14, 2004, due to low ratings, leaving four episodes unaired in the United States. In the United Kingdom, all the episodes aired on Sky One. The series later aired in syndication on HDNet and the Sci Fi Channel. The series was filmed in Toronto and Vancouver, Canada.

The series revolves around a computer expert, Jake Foley, who works for the U.S. government's National Security Agency (NSA) and was accidentally infected by nanobots which give him superhuman powers. He is able to control technology with his brain, making him "the ultimate human upgrade", according to the show's introduction.

Cast

Main
 Christopher Gorham as Jake Foley
 Philip Anthony-Rodriguez as Kyle Duarte
 Judith Scott as Deputy Director Louise "Lou" Beckett
 Marina Black as Sarah Carter
 Keegan Connor Tracy as Diane Hughes (doctor)

Recurring
 Miranda Frigon as Tech Agent Susan Carver
 Rachel Hayward as Executive Director Valerie Warner
 Grace Park as Fran Yoshida (Dr. Hughes' assistant)
 Kurt Evans as Tech Agent Hart
 Jesse Cadotte as DuMont
 Jim Byrnes as Chief Director Skerritt

Episodes

The final four episodes premiered on Sky1 in the UK.

Three more episodes were originally planned before the series was canceled. They were as follows:
 "The Fix"
 "Libra"
 "Nano-A-Nano"
Javier Grillo-Marxuach, a writer on the series, announced that the first of these had been scripted at the time of cancellation, with the other two outlined to conclude this final story arc. The plot outline can be found in a fansite interview.

Home media
Visual Entertainment Inc. (under license from CBS) released Jake 2.0 on DVD on May 3, 2019.

See also
 Chuck
 Intelligence
 Max Steel
 The Six Million Dollar Man

References

External links
 

2000s American science fiction television series
2003 American television series debuts
2004 American television series endings
English-language television shows
Fictional characters with superhuman strength
Fictional technopaths
Television series by CBS Studios
Television shows filmed in Toronto
Television shows filmed in Vancouver
UPN original programming
Espionage television series